Prairie Grove order of battle may refer to:

 Prairie Grove Confederate order of battle
 Prairie Grove Union order of battle